Overdrive is a 2017 action thriller film directed by Antonio Negret, produced by Michael Brandt, Derek Haas and Pierre Morel and the screenplay was written by Michael Brandt and Derek Haas. The film stars are Scott Eastwood, Freddie Thorp, Ana de Armas and Gaia Weiss. Principal photography began on 4 January 2016 in Paris and Marseille, France. The film tells the story of skilled car thieves who are sent to steal a crime lord's luxury car.

Plot 
Half-brothers Andrew and Garret Foster operate as international car thieves, targeting high-end of the market vehicles. They steal a rare Bugatti in transit after it is purchased at auction in France, unaware that the car was bought by Marseille crime boss Jacomo Morier. Morier's men capture them when they try to sell the car and take them to Morier's house, where he shows them his garage full of cars. He then means to shoot them but, to escape their punishment, the brothers offer to help Morier complete his collection by stealing a rare 1962 Ferrari 250 GTO (worth $38,000,000) owned by ruthless tycoon and rival, Max Klemp. Morier agrees but sets the condition that the theft must be carried out within one week.
  		  		
The brothers hurriedly recruit a team in Marseille to carry out the job, including Andrew's girlfriend Stephanie and her pickpocket friend Devin. Andrew tells Garret that this will be his last job. They also have to cope with Morier's cousin Laurent keeping watch on their operation, as well as a pair of Interpol agents. Garret, who had recently been conned by a woman who pretended to fall in love with him, begins a relationship with Devin. For insurance, Morier's men kidnap Stephanie in the Marseille marketplace. Andrew and Garret arrive in their flat and Devin tells them Stephanie has been taken. They head to Morier's house to find Stephanie bound and gagged under a spinning car wheel, which Laurent threatens to lower onto her face. Andrew and Garret promise to finish the job in order to save Stephanie.
  		  		
When the day of the robbery comes, the brothers put their plan into effect. Stephanie, locked in a room in Morier's house, attempts to seduce Laurent and fails, although she manages to steal his key to the door and escapes. She sets off the house alarms and leaves with a rifle to meet Andrew, Garret and their team at the door. Morier realises that the events that led up to this point have been part of an elaborate diversion to allow them to steal his own car collection. Morier only understands what is happening as the gang are making their escape and he chases them to the docks. During the pursuit, Andrew proposes to Stephanie and she agrees to marry him. In a final confrontation, Morier is killed when his car is rammed into the water by a large motor coach driven by Devin. Devin leaves, promising to call Garret.

Andrew and Garret give all of Morier's cars to Klemp, revealing that this had been the plan all along, and that they had partnered with Klemp to get back at Morier. In a further plot twist, the two Interpol agents were also partnered with Klemp. But as Devin leaves, she has in her hand the code to the garage where Klemp keeps his prized Ferrari.

Garret, Stephanie and Andrew are later seen together in Paris. Garrett thinks he has been stood up again when Devin shows up in Klemp's Ferrari and gives the keys to Andrew. When Andrew then gives the car to Garret, Garret thinks this means Andrew is leaving the business. However, Stephanie mentions that there is a very rare car in Barcelona, one out of only nine in the world, and the three are tempted to steal it. Andrew decides to join them and the re-established team begins to make plans.

Cast 
 Scott Eastwood as Andrew Foster, Garrett's older half-brother
 Freddie Thorp as Garret Foster, Andrew's younger half-brother 
 Ana de Armas as Stephanie
 Gaia Weiss as Devin
 Clemens Schick as Max Klemp
 Joshua Fitoussi as Leon
 Kaaris as Frank
 Lester Makedonsky as Rémy
 Philippe Ohrel as Klemp guard
 Anais Pedri as Clair
 Simon Abkarian as Jacomo Morier
  as Laurent Morier
 Moussa Maaskri as Panahi
 Manuel Jimenez as Racer #6
  as Officer Closson
 Frédéric Anscombre as Officer Depaul

Production 
On 12 May 2011 it was announced that Pierre Morel would produce the action thriller film Overdrive, Antonio Negret would direct the film based on the script by Michael Brandt and Derek Haas, who would also produce the film. Sentient Pictures would produce the film. On 1 September 2015 Christopher Tuffin was also announced to produce the film. In November 2015, Kinology sold the film's international rights to different buyers. Alex Pettyfer, Matthew Goode, Garrett Hedlund, Jamie Bell, Karl Urban, Ben Barnes, Emilia Clarke, and Sam Claflin were all once attached separately at various points during development.

Principal photography on the film began on 4 January 2016 in Paris and Marseille, France.

Release
Overdrive was released theatrically in the United Kingdom before it premiered in France and received a staggered European and Asian release before being theatrically released in the United States. The Hollywood Reporter stated that this type of release for a film was generally reserved for "dead-in-the-water duds"

Reception
On review aggregator Rotten Tomatoes, the film holds an approval rating of 29% based on 14 reviews, with an average rating of 4.1/10. The Hollywood Reporter referred to the film as a "formulaic adolescent-male button-pusher, which is witless and brainless but not entirely joyless."

References

External links 
 
 

2017 films
2017 action thriller films
2010s heist films
French heist films
2010s chase films
French action thriller films
Films about automobiles
Films shot in Paris
English-language French films
Films directed by Antonio Negret
2010s French films